Gramercy is a town in the U.S. state of Louisiana, in St. James Parish. It is part of the New Orleans Metropolitan Area . The population was 3,613 at the time of the 2010 U.S. census and 3,188 according to the 2020 population estimates program.

History
Gramercy was originally an American Indian and French settlement and trading post. In 1739, much of the area which is now known as Gramercy was sold to Joseph Delille Dupart, Commissioner of Indian Nations under
Jean-Baptiste Le Moyne de Bienville. The town was incorporated in November 1947. A historic sugar mill was established in Gramercy in 1895, which became the Colonial Sugar Refinery in 1902. The National Park Service has designated the site as the Colonial Sugar National Historic District.

Geography
Gramercy is located at  (30.053907, -90.689154). The town of Gramercy is bordered on the west by the town of Lutcher and on the south by the Mississippi River. Gramercy is approximately 36 miles west of New Orleans

Demographics

As of the 2020 United States census, there were 2,932 people, 1,177 households, and 954 families residing in the town. The 2019 American Community Survey determined the racial and ethnic makeup of the town was 46.8% non-Hispanic white, 52.1% Black and African American, and 1,1% Asian. Of the population, males had a median income of $45,071 versus $38,306 for females. The median household income was $57,750, and 17.7% of the population lived at or below the poverty line.

At the 2000 United States census, there were 3,066 people, 1,090 households, and 833 families residing in the town. The racial makeup of the town was 63.60% White, 34.83% African American, 0.46% Native American, 0.10% Asian, and 1.01% from two or more races. Hispanics or Latin Americans of any race were 0.72% of the population.

In 2000, there were 1,090 households, out of which 35.0% had children under the age of 18 living with them, 53.4% were married couples living together, 18.1% had a female householder with no husband present, and 23.5% were non-families. 20.8% of all households were made up of individuals, and 7.9% had someone living alone who was 65 years of age or older. The average household size was 2.81 and the average family size was 3.27. In the town, the population was spread out, with 28.6% under the age of 18, 7.5% from 18 to 24, 30.0% from 25 to 44, 21.1% from 45 to 64, and 12.7% who were 65 years of age or older. The median age was 35 years. For every 100 females, there were 95.3 males. For every 100 females age 18 and over, there were 89.4 males at the 2000 U.S. census.

In 2000, the median income for a household in the town was $33,824, and the median income for a family was $39,350. Males had a median income of $39,013 versus $22,750 for females. The per capita income for the town was $14,040. About 17.4% of families and 21.3% of the population were below the poverty line, including 29.2% of those under age 18 and 10.0% of those age 65 or over.

Industry

Gramercy is the home of Zapp's Potato Chips and Louisiana Sugar Refining, LLC (LSR).

LSR operates a state-of-the-art sugar refinery with a capacity of 3,100 tons per day. The refinery employs about 150 people. LSR is located in the Colonial Sugars National Historic District.

See also

 Zapp's, a brand of highly seasoned, kettle-style potato chips manufactured in Gramercy.
 St. James Parish, Louisiana

References

Towns in St. James Parish, Louisiana
New Orleans metropolitan area
Louisiana populated places on the Mississippi River